Ramona High School is a high school in Riverside, California, United States, part of the Riverside Unified School District, and the home of the Ramona Rams. Ramona graduated its first class of students in 1958. Ramona has been designated as a "National Demonstration School" for the AVID Program.

Institution
Ramona's feeder middle schools are Chemawa Middle School and Sierra Middle School. Riverside Polytechnic High School(1965), Ramona, and John W. North High School (1965) are the three oldest high schools in the Riverside Unified School District.

Ramona Creative and Performing Arts (RCAPA)
Ramona's Creative and Performing Arts magnet program provides visual, creative and performing arts classes to more than 1,200 students on their campus and comprises the largest elective department at Ramona.

Dynasty Band and Color Guard
Ramona's Dynasty Band and Color Guard participated in the 2004 Thanksgiving Day Parade in Chicago, Illinois, and the 2006 New Year's Day Parade in Paris, France. In December 2014, Dynasty performed in the Hollywood Christmas Parade.

RCAPA, as of the 2013-2014 school year, offers the following courses:

Art Design
Band / Color Guard
Ceramics
Culinary
Dance 
Drawing
Film/Television/Video Production
Orchestra
Painting
Piano / Music Theory
Technical Theatre Production
Vocal Performance

AVID Program
Ramona High School implemented Advancement Via Individual Determination (AVID) in 1987 becoming the first site outside of San Diego County to use the program.  When Ramona High School started their AVID system, only three percent of the 325 graduating students went to college.  Today, ninety-nine percent of the AVID students at Ramona enroll in college.
  
More than 1,200 students have graduated from Ramona's AVID program, receiving more Dell and Gates scholarships than any other high school in the nation.

Sports
Girls': Swimming, Water Polo, Tennis, Basketball, Soccer, Golf, Cross Country, Track, Softball, Volleyball, Cheerleading
Boys': Football, Baseball, Swimming, Water Polo, Tennis, Basketball, Soccer, Golf, Cross Country, Wrestling, Track

The Boys' football team won CIF Titles in 1983 and 1989.  The Ramona High school stadium underwent extensive remodeling and was re-opened in 2010.

Notable alumni 
Cheri Jo Bates
Michael L. Coats CAPT USN Ret. NASA Astronaut, Director: Johnson Space Center
Paco Craig, gridiron football player
Marc Danzeisen, Professional Musician, Producer, Actor 
Tom Hall, Major League Baseball pitcher
Gary McCord, golfer, PGA Tour
Darrell Miller, Major League Baseball catcher
Eric Show, Major League Baseball pitcher
Ron Tingley, Major League Baseball catcher
Andre Ewell, Professional MMA fighter
Brett Rossi, model, adult actress
Mark Warkentien, National Basketball Association executive

References

External links
 
 

Educational institutions established in 1959
High schools in Riverside, California
Public high schools in California
1959 establishments in California